The International Trade and Investment Directorate is a directorate of the Scottish Government. The main areas of responsibility of the directorate are the internationalisation of the economy of Scotland and maximising the value of the food and drink industry sector of the Scottish economy.

The directorate is responsible for setting policy relating to trade, capital and foreign investment, and food and drink sectoral policy.

Composition

Cabinet Secretaries

 Kate Forbes, Cabinet Secretary for Finance and the Economy
 Ivan McKee, Minister for Business, Trade, Tourism and Enterprise]]
 Angus Robertson, Cabinet Secretary for the Constitution, External Affairs and Culture

Management of the board

 Liz Ditchburn, Director-General of Economy

See also

 Economy of Scotland
 Scottish Government
 Directorates of the Scottish Government

References 

Directorates of the Scottish Government